The Bransford Spring Pumphouse, in Mammoth Cave National Park, in Mammoth Cave, Kentucky, was built in 1939.  It was listed on the National Register of Historic Places in 1991.  The listing included two contributing structures (the pumphouse and a cistern) and a contributing site (the spring).

The pumphouse is a one-story, two-room NPS Rustic-style building built of sandstone by the Civilian Conservation Corps.

See also 
 Chalybeate Springs Hotel Springhouse: Also in Edmonson County
 National Register of Historic Places listings in Edmonson County, Kentucky

References

National Register of Historic Places in Edmonson County, Kentucky
National Register of Historic Places in Mammoth Cave National Park
Infrastructure completed in 1939
National Park Service Rustic architecture
1939 establishments in Kentucky
Civilian Conservation Corps in Kentucky
Water supply pumping stations on the National Register of Historic Places
Water supply infrastructure in Kentucky